Bobby Lee Christine (born September 17, 1969) is an American attorney and former judge who was the United States Attorney for the United States District Court for the Southern District of Georgia from 2017 to 2021. He briefly also served as the Acting U.S. Attorney for the United States District Court for the Northern District of Georgia in 2021. Christine was previously an Assistant District Attorney in Augusta, Georgia. He is a former magistrate judge in Columbia County, Georgia, and partner at the law firm of Christine and Evans LLC.

Education
Christine earned undergraduate degrees from Georgia Military College and the University of Georgia, and his Juris Doctor from Samford University's Cumberland School of Law in Birmingham. He has a master’s degree from the U.S. Army War College in Carlisle, Pennsylvania.

Career
He worked as a prosecutor in the Augusta district attorney's office for a decade. From 2005 until 2017 he was a judge of the Magistrate Court for Columbia County, serving as chief magistrate from 2009 to 2012. He also maintained a private practice until 2017.

Christine is a veteran of the United States Armed Forces, having joined the Army National Guard at age 17 and earned his commission as an officer at age 19. He remains a reservist as of 2021 with the rank of brigadier general. Christine entered the U.S. Army JAG Corps. Christine has served as a combat engineer platoon leader, company executive officer, Judge Advocate General Trial Counsel, Brigade Judge Advocate, and State Judge Advocate. He earned several medals, including the Bronze Star, for meritorious service after spending time in Iraq as a Judge Advocate General and a combat engineer with the 265th Engineer Group.

U.S. Attorney for the Southern District of Georgia
On September 11, 2017, Christine was nominated to be the United States Attorney for the United States District Court for the Southern District of Georgia by President Donald Trump. He was confirmed by the United States Senate by voice vote on November 15, 2017, and sworn into office on November 22, 2017.

Acting U.S. Attorney for the Northern District of Georgia 
On January 5, 2021, Trump named Christine the Acting United States Attorney for the United States District Court for the Northern District of Georgia after B. J. Pak abruptly resigned from the post the prior day. Reportedly, Trump expected Christine to support his claims of election fraud in Georgia, which Pak had refused to do. However, a few days after taking office, Christine privately informed his staff that "there's just nothing to" those allegations, and he never said anything publicly on the subject.

The U.S. Attorney's office announced Christine's resignation on February 1, 2021. His resignation was effective February 9.

District attorney for Columbia County
In April 2021 he was appointed the first district attorney for Columbia County, Georgia, whose judicial circuit was split from that of Richmond County in March.

Personal life
He and his wife Shari have three children and live in Evans, Georgia.

References

External links
 Biography at U.S. Department of Justice

1969 births
Living people
20th-century American lawyers
21st-century American judges
21st-century American lawyers
Cumberland School of Law alumni
Georgia (U.S. state) state court judges
People from Columbia County, Georgia
Recipients of the Legion of Merit
United States Army generals
United States Army personnel of the Iraq War
United States Attorneys for the Southern District of Georgia
University of Georgia alumni